Macrocoma meruensis is a species of leaf beetle found in Tanzania and Democratic Republic of the Congo. It was first described by Julius Weise in 1909.

References 

meruensis
Beetles of Africa
Beetles of the Democratic Republic of the Congo
Insects of Tanzania
Beetles described in 1909
Taxa named by Julius Weise